Crookwell is a small town located in the Southern Tablelands of New South Wales, Australia, in the Upper Lachlan Shire. The town is at a relatively high altitude of 887 metres and there are several snowfalls during the winter months. The nearest major centre is the city of Goulburn which is about a half-hour drive to the south-east of the town. Crookwell is easily accessible to the state capital of Sydney and also the federal capital of Canberra.

Most employment is based on rural industries, and the district is renowned for potato farming. Crookwell is also home to what was NSW's first wind farm, which consists of 8 turbines, and is located a few kilometres out of town on the road towards Goulburn.

A railway once connected Goulburn and Crookwell, which opened in 1902, but passenger services to Crookwell station ceased in 1974, and the last goods train ran in 1985. The line is technically not closed, but has been listed as out of use, and in some locations is now impassable.

History

The area now known as Crookwell lies within the traditional lands of the Gundangurra people. These people spoke a similar if not identical language to the neighbouring Ngunnawal  people to their south.

The first Europeans known to be in the area were the exploratory party of surveyor James Meehan which camped 1 km south of present-day Grabben Gullen (12 km south-west of Crookwell). John Oxley passed to the north and east later that same year. Crookwell was originally known as "Kiama" but later renamed after the river. The area around Crookwell was first settled in the 1820s, and had received its current name by the 1860s. 

By 1840, some inns had appeared at the crossroads, but Binda remained the head of the district.After this, selection of blocks occurred; and the population of was over 100 by midway through that decade. The first allotments were sold at the end of the decade. By the mid-1870s the population had already reached 1000 people.

In 1865, Mary Gilmore was born just 16km south in the town or Roslyn.

From 1941 to 1945, 508,500 tons of iron ore was mined—about six miles by road from the town—and railed to Port Kembla for wartime steel production.

Crookwell contained one of Australias first wind farms, the Crookwell Wind Farm and the first wind farm that fed into the national power grid.

Heritage listings 
Crookwell has a number of heritage-listed sites, including:
 Goulburn-Crookwell railway: Crookwell railway station

Population
In the 2021 Census, there were 2,686 people in Crookwell. In the 2016 census 85.8% of people were born in Australia and 91.4% of people spoke only English at home. The most common responses for religion were Catholic 34.9%, Anglican 30.1%, No Religion 14.3% and Uniting Church 7.8%.

Governance
Crookwell is the seat of the Upper Lachlan Shire Council local government area (LGA) of New South Wales, Australia, formed in 2004.

Transport
Crookwell is approximately 2.5 hours drive from Sydney via Goulburn, and 1.5 hours from Canberra. Other than the main road to Goulburn, minor roads link Crookwell with Bathurst, Boorowa, Grabben Gullen, Laggan, and Taralga.

Crookwell railway station is the terminus of the now disused Crookwell railway line.

Crookwell has a small unpaved airstrip approximately 5 km south of the town.

Climate

Owing to its exposed western location on the upwind side of the Great Dividing Range and rather southern latitude, snow is not uncommon during the winter months, with occasional heavy falls. Summers are warm and dry, with occasional severe thunderstorms. Winters are cold and wet; when the prevailing westerly cloud is persistent, daily maximum temperatures can struggle to exceed .

Media

Radio stations
Radio stations with transmitters located in Crookwell include:
 Crookwell FM 88.0 FM
 Triple J 91.7 FM (2JJJ)
 93.5 Eagle FM 103.9 FM (commercial) (2SNO)
 GNFM 106.1 FM (commercial) (2GBN)
 ABC Local Radio 106.9 FM (2ABCRR)
 ABC Radio National 107.7 FM (2ABCRN)

Depending on location some Goulburn, Illawarra, and/or Canberra based radio stations can also be heard. Eagle FM and GNFM (formerly 2GN) are Goulburn based but licensed to serve towns in the Southern Tablelands including Crookwell. In order to reach Crookwell, both have transmitters which relay the Goulburn broadcast but on different frequencies to Goulburn.

Television
Crookwell has a low powered transmitter broadcasting ABC Television.

Residents wishing to receive a wider range of channels and in digital can attempt to receive signals from either Canberra (Black Mountain), or Orange (Mount Canobolas), although Crookwell is located in the fringe area of both transmitters.

Another option is to use the VAST free-to-view satellite service, which offers a similar range of channels.

Newspaper
The local newspaper, the Crookwell Gazette has been published since 1885.

Notable people
Notable people include Kellie White and Emily Smith (Hockeyroos Captain), who both played for the Hockeyroos in international competition, Mary Douven, a notable community volunteer who gave her time to help the local sporting communities and church groups, who unfortunately died in 2020 one year to the day after her husband Theo Douven, who was a long term employee of the local Upper Lachlan Shire Council.

Photo gallery

See also
 Crookwell railway line

References

Upper Lachlan Shire
Towns in New South Wales
Southern Tablelands
Mining towns in New South Wales